Borucino  (German: Burzen) is a village in the administrative district of Gmina Okonek, within Złotów County, Greater Poland Voivodeship, in west-central Poland.

The village has a population of 500.

References

Borucino